The Next Great American Band is a reality television talent show. The show premiered on October 19, 2007 and aired on Fox at 8 p.m. Eastern and Pacific times Friday nights. The show was taped at CBS Television City in Los Angeles on Wednesday evenings in Studio 36, which is the same studio used for American Idol.

The program was created by 19 Entertainment, which is one of the companies behind American Idol, and the show shared the same basic concept as Idol. This time, however, the winner was not a singer but instead a musical band. The contest was open to performers of all genres of music, and there were no age limits for the performers. The three judges were Australian Idol judge Ian "Dicko" Dickson, Sheila E., and John Rzeznik of The Goo Goo Dolls. Dickson served as a judge on Australian Idol concurrently. The host of the show was New Zealand Idol host Dominic Bowden.

In promotional announcements that aired on the final episodes of So You Think You Can Dance, another 19 creation, the title was given one night as American Band, then the next night as The Next Great American Band. The show was officially announced May 16, 2007 at the American Idol website and Fox announced the pickup the next day.

On May 15, 2008, a year after the show was announced, the series was officially cancelled due to poor ratings. The eventual winners, The Clark Brothers (later renamed Sons of Sylvia ) disbanded in 2012.

Auditions

Over 6000 bands sent in audition tapes. 60 bands from around the country were chosen to participate in a judging session that took place at the Montelago Resort in Lake Las Vegas, Nevada on August 19–25, 2007. While most of these 60 bands were flown straight to Las Vegas as 'gimmick' acts, the ones being seriously considered for the show participated in a round of regional auditions and then auditions in Los Angeles before advancing to Las Vegas. Twelve of these forty acts were chosen by show producers and judges to become semifinalist acts to compete against each other in the main season of the show beginning October 19. Again, the show resembled Idol at this point, with telephone and text message votes deciding the winner. There was no results show after the live performance. In each episode, the results were shown in the green room. The two bands (one in later episodes) with the lowest votes were forced to perform in the green room via the internet. Unlike American Idol, however, the final episode was a winner-takes-all showdown between the top three bands, not two. The results were shown live in the grand finale and the host only presented the winner to the viewing audience right after the final commercial break.

The audition rounds of the show were kept very secretive by the producers, and thus caused some controversy between bands who had sent in audition tapes. Many online forums and chat rooms were full of bands falsely stating they had been selected to appear on the show, and further confused hopefuls by posting several versions of the rules, contracts, and audition details.

Top 12

: Each band performed an original song and a cover of a song by the theme artist.
: The bands only performed a cover of a song by the artist listed above.
: The bands played a song chosen by the judges, a song chosen by the producers and a song they chose.
: In the final episode the bands did not perform any theme, but chose songs to showcase their band.
: The elimination date is the date of broadcast of the show where the elimination was announced. The actual elimination in each case occurred two days earlier, when the show was taped.

Other participating bands

The following is a list of bands who did not make it to the Top 12. These bands were either seen on Episode 1 (the Vegas auditions) or are featured on the official website:

Ballroom Dancing
The Van-Dells
The Daytime Soap Stars
waketheday
The 440 Alliance
The Queue
Fat Shitty Surprise
Blackbird
BoTcHED
Faces Without Names
Mezcal
Nothing More
Northmont
The Early Republic
The Dirty Marmaduke Flute Squad
Gothic Heavy Metal

Zombie Bazooka Patrol
Simply Sick
Fifi LaRue  
The Groovin Grannies
Just Live
Starchild
Red Halo
Honky Stomp
The Cat's Pajamas

El Toro's League
J.I.Z.
Big Provider
Viva Las Jablonski
Zolar X
The Sizzling Happy Family
Sunset West

Lexicon
Dova Grove
The Fabulous Johnson Brothers
The Big Toe
Heaven Bound
Thirteen Stars
Potential Difference

Nielsen ratings

References

External links
Official Website (via Internet Archive)
Announcement of show

The Next Great American Band at Vote For The Worst
The Next Great American Band Blog

2000s American reality television series
Fox Broadcasting Company original programming
2000s American music television series
2007 American television series debuts
2007 American television series endings